Thomas Pendelton (born April 28, 1971) is an American tattoo artist and television personality. He starred in the A&E reality television show Tattoo Highway.

Career
Pendelton apprenticed under Rick Walters at Bert Grimm's Tattoo in Long Beach, California.

He was a featured tattoo artist on the television show Inked filmed in Las Vegas. He starred in a reality television show titled Tattoo Highway on A&E in 2009.

He is the founder of a clothing line called Ministry of Ink.

References

External links
 

1971 births
Living people
Participants in American reality television series
People from Anaheim, California
American tattoo artists